The Wayward Sons of Mother Earth is the debut album by British folk metal band Skyclad, and is regarded as one of the first folk metal albums, with the track "The Widdershins Jig" in particular pointing the way for the genre. Front cover artwork is by Garry Sharpe-Young.

Track listing
 All lyrics by Martin Walkyier.  All music as noted under "Writer(s)". (Published by Dark Wings.)

Personnel
Skyclad
Martin Walkyier - vocals
Steve Ramsey - lead, rhythm and acoustic guitars
Graeme English - electric bass, classical guitar
Keith Baxter - drums, percussion

Additional musicians
Joe "Guido" Caprani - voice on track 6
Dominic Miller - classical guitar lead on track 9
Mike Evans - fiddle
Rog Patterson - keyboards, piccolo

References

1991 debut albums
Skyclad (band) albums
Noise Records albums
Albums produced by Kevin Ridley